Hick is a 2011 American comedy-drama film directed by Derick Martini, based on the novel of the same name by Andrea Portes that draws on non-fictional elements. The film stars Chloë Grace Moretz, Eddie Redmayne, Ray McKinnon, Rory Culkin, Juliette Lewis, Blake Lively, and Alec Baldwin. It premiered at the Toronto International Film Festival on September 10, 2011. It received a limited theatrical release on May 11 and is distributed by Phase 4 Films.

Plot
In the 1980s, a girl named Luli McMullen lives with her neglectful mother and alcoholic father in a small Nebraska town. On her 13th birthday, she receives a revolver as a gift. Shortly thereafter, Luli sees a commercial for Las Vegas and decides to run away there. She hitches a ride from Eddie, an erratic drifter with a damaged leg. They argue and she leaves the car. She eventually convinces another passerby, Glenda, to give her a ride. When Glenda asks Luli her name, Glenda makes fun of it and tells her how much of a “hick” name it is. Moments later, Glenda gives Luli a bump of cocaine and Luli begins to experience minor visual hallucinations as they drive down the backroads. They bond after Luli helps Glenda rob a store and spend the night in a trailer behind a bowling alley, where a little boy named Angel lives and who Glenda seems to take care of on some level. Luli again encounters Eddie that night in the parking lot of the bowling alley.

The next day, Glenda takes Luli to the house she shares with her husband, Lloyd. Luli discovers that Eddie works for Lloyd, and also that Glenda knows Eddie and is quite upset to see him. While Lloyd initially appears friendly, his true nature shows through when he viciously berates Eddie for a perceived mistake (Eddie retaliates by urinating in Lloyd's drink, which goes undetected by Lloyd). Eddie tells Luli that Lloyd and Glenda want to be alone, so he takes her to a bar. Eddie is interrupted while hustling pool by Luli, and when his hustle fails, the man that he was hustling makes a deal with Eddie on terms uncertain to the audience. The man then follows Luli into the bathroom and tries to rape her. She fights him before Eddie comes in and savagely beats the man to death.

As they leave the bar, Eddie says that Glenda has asked him to take Luli to a Motel 6 to meet Glenda because she got in a fight with Lloyd, but not before Luli walks in on Eddie doing drugs with two junkies. At the motel, Eddie tells Luli that Glenda actually gave him a thousand dollars to take her off Glenda's hands. Heartbroken by this news and unnerved by Eddie's behavior, Luli goes outside, where she meets a boy named Clement and has a nice time playing a drinking game with him. Eddie interrupts them in a drunken outburst, and the two leave the motel. When Eddie insinuates he's fallen in love with Luli, she tells him she will never love him back and asks him to pull over, leaving the car despite Eddie begging her to stay. While she's walking away, Eddie suddenly gets out of the car and chases Luli into a cornfield, where he rapes her off screen.

The next day, Luli wakes up to find herself tied to a bed in a rented cabin at a resort and dressed differently, with shorter hair that's been dyed black. Luli shouts for help to no avail. Eddie arrives with flowers, unties her and professes his love for her, promising to never rape her again. They are interrupted by the proprietor, Beau, who briefly talks with both of them and leaves. The next day, Luli, tied up again, wakes up to find Glenda in the room. Glenda confesses that Eddie was her lover, that Angel is their son together, and that she's spent years running from him. Luli also finds out that Eddie lied about Glenda giving him money and that he essentially kidnapped her from Lloyd's house; Glenda has been looking for her ever since. They are soon caught by Eddie, who accidentally shoots and kills Glenda with Luli's revolver. Luli picks up the gun and kills Eddie before falling to the ground. Later, Beau happens upon the scene. He then feeds Luli eggs and talks about his sister and how "she always wanted a daughter", insisting that Luli "look her up".

Beau then drives Luli to the bus station, her plan being to reunite with her own family. After she calls home, she learns her mother was barely concerned with her being missing and her father has also disappeared, a fact also met with relative indifference by her mother. Luli realizes she will be no better off if she goes back. While on the bus, she looks through her notebook of drawings and finds a note from Beau reading "Dear Luli, in case you change your mind" on a picture he drew of his sister's home in Los Angeles with her address written on the picture. She manages to get off by telling the bus driver that she needed to take her medicine and simulates an epileptic attack. Once off the bus, Luli runs all the way back to the station and buys a ticket to Los Angeles.

Cast

Reception
Although the novel was a bestseller, Hick received almost universally negative reviews by critics. On the review aggregator website Rotten Tomatoes, the film holds an approval rating of 5% based on 22 reviews, with an average rating of 3.1/10. The website's critics consensus reads, "Hick talented young star is ill served by a film whose story wavers between discomfitingly inappropriate and simply muddled." Metacritic, which uses a weighted average, assigned the film a score of 28 out of 100, based on 10 critics, indicating "generally unfavorable reviews".

References

External links
 

2011 films
2011 comedy-drama films
2010s coming-of-age comedy-drama films
2010s road comedy-drama films
2010s sex comedy films
2010s teen comedy-drama films
American coming-of-age comedy-drama films
American road comedy-drama films
American sex comedy films
American teen comedy-drama films
2010s English-language films
Films based on American novels
Films directed by Derick Martini
Films set in the 1980s
Films set in Nevada
Films shot in Nevada
Films shot in North Carolina
Girls with guns films
2010s American films